Layer0 (previously Moovweb), is an American software company based in San Francisco, California, providing infrastructure to run dynamic websites frontends.

The company was founded in 2009 by Ajay Kapur and Ishan Anand with $700,000 invested by Andy Bechtolsheim, and has since raised $16.7 million in venture funding. The company helped integrate Google Wallet into the 1-800-Flowers.com mobile site. Moovweb is a Google Wallet Premium Platform Partner. Moovweb has employed PayPal Express checkout on some of the sites it has developed.

Moovweb has rebranded itself as Layer0 in April 24, 2021.

In July 2021 the company was acquired by Edgio.

External links
 Layer0.co Website

References

Software companies based in the San Francisco Bay Area
Defunct software companies of the United States